Venusia comptaria, the brown-shaded carpet moth, is a moth in the family Geometridae. The species was first described by Francis Walker in 1860. It is found in eastern North America, from Florida to Newfoundland, west to Manitoba. The habitat consists of woodlands.

The wingspan is about 20 mm. The forewings are pale grey with faint wavy lines. Adults are on wing in spring.

References

Moths described in 1860
Venusia (moth)